Men Without Work is a 1929 German silent action film directed by and starring Harry Piel. It was shot at the Staaken Studios in Berlin and on location in Marseille. 
The film's sets were designed by the art director Robert Neppach. It premiered at the UFA-Palast am Zoo.

Cast

References

Bibliography

External links

1929 films
Films of the Weimar Republic
Films directed by Harry Piel
German silent feature films
German black-and-white films
Films shot at Staaken Studios
Films shot in Marseille
1920s action films
German action films